Daniel Carlsson (born 14 November 1976) is a former swimmer from Sweden. He won gold medals in 4 × 50 m medley relay at the 1998 and 1999 European Short Course Swimming Championships (making a new world best time the first time) and 4 × 50 m freestyle at 1998. He won also a bronze medal in 50 m backstroke at 1998. He competed in the 2000 Summer Olympics.

Personal bests

Long course (50 m)

Short course (25 m)

Clubs
Botkyrka-Rönninge SS (-1992)
Väsby SS (1992–2003)
Malmö KK (2005)

References

1976 births
Living people
Swedish male butterfly swimmers
Swedish male backstroke swimmers
Swedish male freestyle swimmers
Swimmers at the 2000 Summer Olympics
Olympic swimmers of Sweden
Medalists at the FINA World Swimming Championships (25 m)
People from Botkyrka Municipality
Botkyrka-Rönninge SS swimmers
Väsby SS swimmers
Malmö KK swimmers
Sportspeople from Stockholm County
20th-century Swedish people